Étienne Delessert may refer to:
Étienne Delessert (banker)
Étienne Delessert (illustrator)